The naturelle leaf chameleon (Brookesia karchei ) is a species of chameleon, a lizard in the family Chamaeleonidae. The species is endemic to Madagascar. It was rated as an endangered species by the International Union for Conservation of Nature on its Red List of Threatened Species. The species was described by Édouard-Raoul Brygoo, Charles Pierre Blanc, and Charles Domergue in 1970.

Etymology
The specific name, karchei, is in honor of geologist Jean-Paul Karche.

Geographic range, habitat, and conservation status
The naturelle leaf chameleon is found in Madagascar in Marojejy National Park (Massif du Marojezy or Parc National de Marojejy) centered on the Marojejy Massif. The species can be found over an area of 597 km2 (231 mi2), and is listed as endangered by the International Union for Conservation of Nature, because of loss of "quality" forest habitat caused by the extraction of richly hued rosewood timber, although the true population of the species has not been determined. The extraction of rosewood is its main threat. It is terrestrial and is found in humid forests at mid- or low-elevation. In the Marojejy National Park, collection of this chameleon, and all others, is illegal.

History
This species was initially described by Brygoo, Blanc, and Domergue in 1970 as Brookesia karchei. This scientific name was later referenced by Glaw and Vences in 1994: 240, Nečas in 1999: 277, Townsend et al. in 2009, and most recently Glaw et al. in 2012.

Description

References

Further reading
Brygoo ER, Blanc CP, Domergue CA (1970). "Notes sur les Brookesia de Madagascar. III. B. karchei n. sp. du Massif du Majorezy ". Annales de l'Université de Madagascar, Sciences 7: 267-271. (in French).

Brookesia
Reptiles described in 1970
Taxa named by Édouard-Raoul Brygoo
Taxa named by Charles Pierre Blanc
Taxa named by Charles Domergue
Reptiles of Madagascar
Endemic fauna of Madagascar